Exploits of a Young Don Juan (also known as What Every Frenchwoman Wants) is a 1986 French-Italian erotic coming of age film written and directed by Gianfranco Mingozzi. 

It is loosely based on the novel Les Exploits d'un jeune Don Juan by Guillaume Apollinaire.

Plot 
Roger comes home from boarding school at the age of 16 during his vacation and this story describes how his puberty hit hard in a house filled with beautiful women. These women have previous engagements with other men who are away, and during this time, Roger impregnates them, then devises plans to cuckold those men.

Cast 
Serena Grandi as Ursula
Claudine Auger as The Mother
Marina Vlady as Madame Muller
Fabrice Josso as Roger
François Perrot as The Father
Aurélien Recoing as Adolphe
Rosette as Helene
Laurent Spielvogel as Mr. Frank
Alexandra Vandernoot as Elisa
Marion Peterson as Kate
Yves Lambrecht as Roland
Virginie Ledoyen as Bertha
Rufus as The Monk

References

External links

1986 films
Italian sex comedy films
French sex comedy films
French coming-of-age films
Films directed by Gianfranco Mingozzi
Italian coming-of-age films
Juvenile sexuality in films
Incest in film
Films set in 1914
Films with screenplays by Jean-Claude Carrière
Guillaume Apollinaire
Films scored by Nicola Piovani
1980s French-language films
1980s French films
1980s Italian films